MNO is an abbreviation for mobile network operator. It may also refer to
Manganese oxide (MnO)
Ministry of Defence in some Slavic-speaking countries:
Ministry of Defence (Czechoslovakia)
Ministry of Defence of the Slovak State
Multinational organization
 Manono Airport (IATA airport code MNO) in Manono, Democratic Republic of the Congo
 Master of Nonprofit Organizations, a graduate-level degree